"Ma Normandie" was the official regional anthem of the Bailiwick of Jersey, a British Crown dependency in the Channel Islands, and was written and composed by Frédéric Bérat. Jersey is historically part of the Duchy of Normandy, and French has been for centuries an official administrative language of Jersey, whose inhabitants have traditionally spoken a variety of Norman language.

Although "Ma Normandie" is used by Jersey at Commonwealth Games, Island Games and other international events where it is necessary for territories that otherwise use "God Save the Queen" to be distinguished, the fact that the song refers to France rather than to Jersey means that a body of opinion has campaigned for a change of anthem.

In 2007 the States of Jersey undertook to find a new, official, Anthem by means of an open competition. The final judging of the competition took place with a public performance of the short-listed pieces on 30 April 2008. The short-listed composers were: Derek Lawrence, Gerard Le Feuvre, James Taberner and a joint composition by Kevin Porée and Matheson Bayley; the traditional song "Beautiful Jersey"/"Man Bieau P'tit Jèrri" was also included in the shortlist. The winner of the competition was declared to be "Island Home" composed by Gerard Le Feuvre. A Jèrriais version of the English lyrics will be provided. The States will take the decision on whether to ratify the adoption of a new anthem in the light of public reaction to the results of the competition.

"Ma Normandie" is also widely used, but unofficially, as the regional anthem of Normandy.

Lyrics

Notes

References

External links
Midi file
mp3 file
 Magène has recorded a new intimist version of this song in the CD "Veillie Normaunde".

Jersey culture
Norman music
Regional songs
British anthems
1836 songs

ko:마 노르망디